The 2006 Canadian Open (also known as the 2006 Rogers Masters and 2006 Rogers Cup for sponsorship reasons) was a tennis tournament played on outdoor hard courts. It was the 117th edition of the Canadian Open, and was part of the ATP Masters Series of the 2006 ATP Tour, and of the Tier I Series of the 2006 WTA Tour. The men's event took place at the Rexall Centre in Toronto, Ontario, Canada, from August 7 through August 13, 2006, and the women's event at the Uniprix Stadium in Montreal, Quebec, Canada, from August 14 through August 20, 2006.

The men's field featured World No. 1, Australian Open and Wimbledon winner Roger Federer, French Open champion and 2005 Canada Masters winner Rafael Nadal, and ATP No. 3 David Nalbandian. Others top seeds competing were Miami Masters runner-up Ivan Ljubičić, Indianapolis champion and Indian Wells finalist James Blake, Nikolay Davydenko, Tommy Robredo and Marcos Baghdatis.

The women's draw was headlined by WTA No. 1 and Stanford winner Kim Clijsters, Charleston and Berlin champion Nadia Petrova, and Miami winner Svetlana Kuznetsova. Other seeds present were Strasbourg winner Nicole Vaidišová, Stockholm runner-up Anastasia Myskina, Martina Hingis, Francesca Schiavone and Dinara Safina.

Finals

Men's singles

 Roger Federer defeated  Richard Gasquet 2–6, 6–3, 6–2
It was Roger Federer's 6th title of the year, and his 40th overall. It was his 3rd Masters title of the year, his 11th overall, and his 2nd win at the event.

Women's singles

 Ana Ivanovic defeated  Martina Hingis 6–2, 6–3
It was Ana Ivanovic's 1st title of the year, and her 2nd overall. It was her 1st career Tier I title.

Men's doubles

 Bob Bryan /  Mike Bryan defeated  Paul Hanley /  Kevin Ullyett 6–3, 7–5

Women's doubles

 Nadia Petrova /  Martina Navratilova defeated  Cara Black /  Anna-Lena Grönefeld 6–1, 6–2

References

External links
Official website
Men's Singles draw
Men's Doubles draw
Men's Qualifying Singles draw
Women's Singles, Doubles, Qualifying Singles and Qualifying Doubles draws

 
Rogers Cup
Rogers Cup
Canadian Open (tennis)
Rogers Cup